Don't Promise Me Anything is a 1937 German comedy film directed by Wolfgang Liebeneiner and starring Luise Ullrich, Viktor de Kowa and Heinrich George. The film's sets were designed by the art directors Karl Weber and Erich Zander. The Berlin premiere took place at the Gloria-Palast. In 1950 Liebeneiner remade the film as When a Woman Loves with Hilde Krahl and Johannes Heesters in the lead roles.

Synopsis
A perfectionist but talented artist is reluctant to sell his paintings, but because they need the money his wife sells them without his knowledge and claims to be the artist herself. However, when she is commissioned to paint a mural she turns to her husband for help.

Cast
Luise Ullrich as Monika
Viktor de Kowa as Maler Martin Pratt
Heinrich George as Kunsthändler Felder
Hubert von Meyerinck as Dr. Elk
Will Dohm as Konsul Brenkow
Charlott Daudert as Vera Brenkow
Hans Hermann Schaufuß as Hausbesitzer Herr Lemke
Wilhelm P. Krüger as Der Gasmann
Maria Wanck as Fräulein Klette, Felders Sekräterin
Leopold von Ledebur as Präsident der Akademie
Erich Dunskus as Gläubiger #1
Margot Erbst as Maria, Mädchen bei Pratt
Maria Loja as Frau Lemke
Hans Meyer-Hanno as Gläubiger
Karl-Heinz Reppert as Gläubiger
Walter Vollmann as Diener bei Felder

Reception
Writing for Night and Day in 1937, Graham Greene gave the film a negative review, describing the film as "unconvincing", and with "the added disadvantage of being [] unfit[] for irrational behaviour". The only point of interest for Greene was the costume and acting of Will Dohm which worryingly evoked German militarism.

References

External links

Films of Nazi Germany
German comedy films
1937 comedy films
Films directed by Wolfgang Liebeneiner
Films with screenplays by Thea von Harbou
Terra Film films
German black-and-white films
German films based on plays
1930s German films